A white-collar worker is a person who performs professional, desk, managerial, or administrative work. White-collar work may be performed in an office or other administrative setting. White-collar workers include job paths related to government, consulting, academia, accountancy, business and executive management, customer support, design, economics, engineering, market research, finance, human resources, operations research, marketing,  public relations, information technology, networking, law, healthcare, architecture, and research and development. Other types of work are those of a grey-collar worker, who has more specialized knowledge than those of a blue-collar worker, whose job requires manual labor.

Etymology
The term refers to the white dress shirts of male office workers common through most of the nineteenth and twentieth centuries in Western countries, as opposed to the blue overalls worn by many manual laborers.

The term "white collar" is credited to Upton Sinclair, an American writer, in relation to contemporary clerical, administrative, and management workers during the 1930s, though references to white-collar work appear as early as 1935. White collar employees are considered highly educated as compared to blue collar.

Health effects
Less physical activity among white-collar workers has been thought to be a key factor in increased life-style related health conditions such as fatigue, obesity, diabetes, hypertension, cancer, and heart disease. Also, working at a computer could potentially lead to diseases associated with monotonous data entry such as carpal tunnel syndrome. Workplace interventions such as alternative activity workstations, sit-stand desks, and promotion of stair use are among measures being implemented to counter the harms of sedentary workplace environments. The quality of evidence used to determine the effectiveness and potential health benefits of many of these interventions is weak. More research is needed to determine which interventions may be effective in the long-term. Low quality evidence indicates that sit-stand desks may reduce sitting in the workplace during the first year of their use, however, it is not clear if sit-stand desks may be effective at reducing sitting in the longer-term.

Demographics
Formerly a minority in the agrarian and early industrial societies, white-collar workers have become a majority in industrialized countries due to modernization and outsourcing of manufacturing jobs.

The blue-collar and white-collar descriptors as it pertains to work dress may no longer be an accurate descriptor, as office attire has broadened beyond a white shirt and tie.  Employees in office environments may wear a variety of colors, may dress in business casuals or wear casual clothes altogether. In addition, the work tasks have blurred.  "White-collar" employees may perform "blue-collar" tasks (or vice versa). An example would be a restaurant manager who may wear more formal clothing yet still assist with cooking food or taking customers' orders, or a construction worker who also performs desk work.

See also
Designation of workers by collar color
Knowledge worker
Salaryman
White-collar crime

Notes

Further reading
 Mills, Charles Wright. White Collar: the American Middle Classes, in series, Galaxy Book[s]. New York: Oxford University Press, 1956. N.B.: "First published [in] 1951."

External links
 

1930s neologisms
Employment classifications
Office work
Social classes